This article lists the helicopter squadrons of the United States Air Force. Helicopter squadrons have various roles, including flying training, air and field support, airlift, and search and rescue.

Helicopter squadrons

See also
 List of United States Air Force squadrons

Helicopter